Shaibu station, is a station on Line 3 of the Shenzhen Metro. It opened on 28 June 2011. It is located at the intersection of Shaibu and Middle Dongmen Roads.

This station is located close to Dongmen, which can be accessed via this station or Laojie Station. Shenzhen Middle School is also located near to this station.

Station layout

Exits

References

External links
 Shenzhen Metro Shaibu Station (Chinese)
 Shenzhen Metro Shaibu Station (English)

Shenzhen Metro stations
Railway stations in Guangdong
Luohu District
Railway stations in China opened in 2011